The Quarry is a 2020 American mystery thriller film directed by Scott Teems, from a screenplay by Teems and Andrew Brotzman, based upon the 1995 novel of the same name by Damon Galgut. It stars Shea Whigham, Michael Shannon, Catalina Sandino Moreno, Bobby Soto, Bruno Bichir and Alvaro Martinez.

It was released on April 17, 2020 in theaters by Lionsgate.

Plot 
Preacher David Martin finds a man unconscious at the side of the road in West Texas. David is traveling to the small town of Bevel to be the new preacher. When they reach a quarry nearby, the man kills David and heads to Bevel.

Arriving at the house where David was to stay, the man claims to be David, and is given room and board from Celia, girlfriend of Chief John Moore, of the three-man local sheriff's department.

Celia's cousins, adult Valentin and teenaged Poco, grow marijuana at the quarry. They steal the real preacher's belongings from the van, including bloody clothes. They later are arrested at the quarry, but the Chief finds David's body, and charge the cousins with murder.

The man is well liked by the local churchgoers, who think he is a good preacher because he does not judge them.

The Chief suspects that the man is guilty, but cannot prove anything. Valentin confesses to the murder, to save Poco. Valentin escapes the court, is shot by the Chief, but continues off into the darkness. The man happens to find him the next day, confesses that he did kill the real David Martin, and that he was on the run after killing his own wife and her lover.  Valentin kills the man, before succumbing to his own wounds.

Celia and Poco leave town together.

Cast
 Shea Whigham as The Man
 Michael Shannon as Chief John Moore
 Catalina Sandino Moreno as Celia
 Bobby Soto as Valentin
 Bruno Bichir as David Martin
 Alvaro Martinez as Poco

Production
In April 2019, it was announced Shea Whigham and Michael Shannon had joined the cast of the film, with Scott Teems directing from a screenplay he wrote alongside Andrew Brotzman, based upon the novel of the same name by Damon Galgut. Filming took place in New Orleans and Garyville, Louisiana.

Release
The film was to have its world premiere at South by Southwest on March 14, 2020. However, the festival was cancelled due to COVID-19 pandemic. It was then scheduled for an April 17, 2020 release.

Reception
The site's critics consensus reads: "The Quarrys potboiler premise is largely squandered on a slow-moving plot whose meanderings thwart the efforts of a talented cast." On Metacritic, the film has a weighted average score of 53 out of 100, based on 14 critics, indicating "mixed or average reviews".

References

External links

2020 films
2020s mystery thriller films
American mystery thriller films
2020 independent films
Films based on South African novels
Films directed by Scott Teems
Films postponed due to the COVID-19 pandemic
Films set in Texas
Films shot in New Orleans
Films shot in Louisiana
Films with screenplays by Scott Teems
Lionsgate films
2020s English-language films
2020s American films